Princess Royal is a title awarded by a British monarch to his or her eldest daughter.

Princess Royal may also refer to:

Titles
 Princess Royal of Portugal
 Princess Royal of Thailand, see Maha Chakri Sirindhorn, Princess Royal of Thailand
 Princess Royal  of Tonga, see Salote Mafileʻo Pilolevu Tuita, Princess Royal of Tonga
 Princess Royal of Jordan, see Basma bint Talal, Princess Royal of Jordan

Transport
 Princess Royal, a GWR 3031 Class locomotive used on the Great Western Railway
 LMS Princess Royal Class, a type of express passenger locomotive built by the London Midland & Scottish Railway
 Princess Royal (ship), several ships

Other uses
 Princess Royal, Western Australia, an abandoned town
 Princess Royal Hospital (disambiguation), various hospitals in England
 an English traditional folk tune known for having multiple Morris Dances set to it; see

See also 

 
 Madame Royale, a style customarily used for the eldest living unmarried daughter of a reigning French monarch
 Prince Royal (disambiguation), a title similar to that of Crown Prince
 Royal Princess (disambiguation)
 Princess (disambiguation)
 Royal (disambiguation)